Choristoneura hebenstreitella, the mountain-ash tortricid, is a moth of the family Tortricidae. It is found in Western Europe, Central Europe, the Near East and Iran.

The wingspan is 19–30 mm. The forewing termen is  hardly sinuate and vertical. The costal fold is short, not reaching the base. The ground colour is light greyish -ochreous, slightly brownish - tinged The basal patch has a straight oblique edge. The anterior edge of the central fascia is straight and the fascia is almost interrupted above the middle. The costal patch is brown. The hindwings are grey. The larva is grey or olive-green; tubercular spots white; head black; plate of 2 brown, blackish -marked, anterior edge white. Julius von Kennel provides a full description. 

The moth flies from May to July.

The larvae feed on species from the genera Betula, Malus, Prunus, Pyrus and Quercus.

References

External links

 UK Moths

Choristoneura
Tortricidae of Europe
Insect pests of temperate forests
Moths described in 1764
Taxa named by Philipp Ludwig Statius Müller